The Río de la Plata Challenger was a tennis tournament held in Buenos Aires, Argentina in 1980 and 1981. The event is part of the ATP Challenger Tour and is played on outdoor clay courts.

Past finals

Singles

Doubles

References

External links 

ATP Challenger Tour
Clay court tennis tournaments
Tennis tournaments in Argentina
Sports competitions in Buenos Aires